The 1950 NAIA basketball tournament was held in March at Municipal Auditorium in Kansas City, Missouri. The 13th annual NAIA basketball tournament featured 32 teams playing in a single-elimination format.

The championship game featured Indiana State and East Central State. It was the first time these two teams had met in the tournament history. The Sycamores defeated the Tigers, 61-57.

This would be Indiana State's highest finish in their 12 career appearances in the NAIA tournament. Winning the championship puts them in a unique group to place 1st, 2nd, 3rd, and 4th. Also Indiana State finally gets a win after 2 times as runner-up. Uniquely, Indiana State has finished as the National Runner-up in the NAIA (1946 and 1948), the NCAA Division I (1979) and the NCAA Division II (1968) tournaments.

Awards and honors
Many of the records set by the 1950 tournament have been broken, and many of the awards were established much later:
Leading scorer est. 1963
Leading rebounder est. 1963
Charles Stevenson Hustle Award est. 1958
All-Tournament Team: Len Rzeszewski, Dan Dimich, Don McDonald - Indiana State; Stacey Howell, Claude Overton - East Central (Okla)
Coach of the Year est. 1954
Player of the Year est. 1994
All-time scoring leaders; first appearance: Lloyd Thorgaard, 10th, Hamline (Minn.) (1950,51,52,53), 15 games, 111 field goals,  61 free throws,  283 total points, 18.9 average per game; James Fritsche, 14th, Hamline (Minn.) (1950,51,52,53), 15 games, 113 field goals, 46 free throws,  272 total points, 18.1 average per game.
All-time scoring leader; final appearance: Harold Haskins, 12th, Hamline (Minn.) (1947,48,49,50), 14 games, 104 field goals, 72 free throws, 280 total points, 20.0 average per game.

Bracket

  *  Denotes overtime.

See also
 1950 NCAA basketball tournament
 1950 National Invitation Tournament

References

NAIA Men's Basketball Championship
Tournament
NAIA men's basketball tournament
NAIA men's basketball tournament